Andie Chen is a Singaporean actor, host and vlogger. He was prominently a full-time Mediacorp artist from 2007 to 2017 but continues to film on an ad hoc basis.

Career
Chen's first appearance on television was in the Channel 5 series Growing Up Season 2 Ep 12: Brother Of Mine in which he made a cameo flashback appearance as a child version of Tay Wee Seng, older brother of Lim Kay Tong's character Charlie Tay Wee Kiat's older brother and was credited as Andy Tan in year 1997. He shot to prominence after winning Star Search 2007 and earned a contract with Mediacorp. He was given his first television roles the following year, most notably in the blockbuster period drama The Little Nyonya.

In August 2015, Chen played the lead role in the Mandarin musical, December Rains, by Toy Factory Productions. It was his first theatrical performance.

Chen was nominated for 3 categories at Star Awards 2017, which are Best Actor for If Only I Could, Best Supporting Actor for Hero & Top 10 Most Popular Male Artistes. On 1 November 2017, Chen announced that he will not be renewing his contract with Mediacorp. Chen left Mediacorp on 31 October 2017 with his wife, Kate Pang. His last drama series with Mediacorp was The Lead. He was nominated for Top 10 Most Popular Male Artistes at the Star Awards 2018.

Personal life

Chen graduated from Tanglin Secondary School before he proceeded on to Ngee Ann Polytechnic where he obtained a diploma in Film, Sound and Video. He married actress Kate Pang in 2013 after a secret courtship and they have a son Aden and a daughter Avery. Chen and Pang have a parenting channel named Kandie Family which was launched in 2016.

Filmography

Television

Films

Theater

Accolades

References

External links 

 

Year of birth missing (living people)
Living people
Singaporean male television actors
Ngee Ann Polytechnic alumni
Singaporean people of Chinese descent